Pehr Gustaf Gyllenhammar (born 28 April 1935) is a Swedish businessman. He is mainly known for his 24 years as CEO and chairman of Volvo, between 1970 and 1994. In the early 1980s he took the initiative for the European Round Table of Industrialists (ERT).

Gyllenhammar lists his current position as Vice Chairman of Rothschild Europe (although a search of Rothschild Europe's website for his name yielded no results). Gyllenhammar was made Commander of the "Ordre National du Mérite" in France in 1980 and he was made Commander of the Legion of Honour in France in 1987. Gyllenhammar became an Honorary Master of the Bench of the Inner Temple, London in 2001.

Early life
Gyllenhammar was born on 28 April 1935 in Gothenburg, Sweden, the son of Pehr Gyllenhammar Sr., a Swedish business man of the Swedish noble family Gyllenhammar, and his Jewish mother, Aina (née Kaplan). He did his military service at Bohuslän Regiment (I 17) in Uddevalla from 1954 to 1955 and became a sergeant. Gyllenhammar graduated from Lund University with a degree in law in 1959 and did internship at law firms in Sweden and studied maritime law in the United States and then aspects of Industrialism at the Centre d’Etudes Industrielles in Geneva, Switzerland in 1968.

Career
He was employed at the insurance company Amphion AB in Gothenburg from 1961 to 1964 and became Deputy Chief Administrative Officer of Skandia Group in 1965. Gyllenhammar became Deputy CEO in 1968 in 1970 he replaced his father, Pehr Gyllenhammar Sr., as CEO. After only a few months he moved to Volvo where he became the CEO in 1971. He replaced his father-in-law Gunnar Engellau, who became chairman, in that position.

At Volvo
Gyllenhammar became one of the most famous businessmen in Sweden at Volvo. He mixed success with failure. He oversaw a wide-reaching diversification of Volvo's business, buying, among other things pharmaceutical company Pharmacia. What finally forced him to leave Volvo was a failed merger with French company Renault.

After Volvo
After Volvo, Gyllenhammar withdrew from Swedish public life and moved to London where he eventually became chairman of insurance company Aviva. He returned to Swedish business in 2004 as Chairman of Investment AB Kinnevik. Gyllenhammar is no longer a member of Investment AB Kinnevik's board.

Other work
Gyllenhammar was the CEO of Svenska skeppshypotekskassan and Ship Transport Secondary Loan Fund (Skeppsfartens sekundärlånekassa) in Gothenburg from 1970 to 1976, chairman there from 1976, board member of Skandinaviska Enskilda Banken from 1979 to 1994 including vice chairman from 1979 to 1994. Gyllenhammar was board member of United Technologies in Hartford, Connecticut from 1981, Swedish Intercontinental Airlines from 1982, Kissinger Associates in New York City from 1982 to 1997, Atlas Copco from 1982, Hamilton Brothers Petroleum in Denver, Colorado from 1982, S. Pearson & Son in London from 1983 to 1997, Swedish Employers Association from 1979, Sveriges Industriförbund from 1979, FA-rådet from 1981, member of the Reuters Holdings PLC from 1984.

He was also a board member of Philips Electronics NV in Eindhoven from 1990 to 1995, Régie Nationale des Usines Renault SA in Paris from 1990 to 1993 and well as chairman of Procordia from 1990 to 1992. Gyllenhammar was board member of Polygram NV from 1996 and became chairman of the board of Commercial Union PLC in 1998 and senior advisor of Lazard Frères & Co LLC in New York City in 1996. Gyllenhammar was the chairman of Aviva and deputy chairman of Rothschild Europe, chairman of Reuters Founders Share Company Limited and of the European Financial Services Roundtable. He was also a member of the International Advisory Committee of Chase Manhattan Bank 1972-1995.

Majid Al Futtaim Group
Majid Al Futtaim Group, a major business chain in the United Arab Emirates, listed Mr Gyllenhammar as its Chairman from June 2007 until March 2009.

Political views
Gyllenhammar has in the past been an outspoken supporter of the Liberal People's Party. In his 1973 book I Believe in Sweden (Jag tror på Sverige) he was steadfast in his support for the Scandinavian model and argued for the kind social liberalism the Liberal People's Party used to support. Gyllenhammar served on the Party board and was widely considered as a future leader of the party. At times, he revealed an ambition to become Prime Minister of Sweden.

Personal life
Gyllenhammar was married 1959–2008 to Christina Engellau (1936–2008), the daughter of Volvo CEO Gunnar Engellau and Margit (née Höckert). They had three daughters and one son: Cecilia, Charlotte, Sophie, and Oscar. He married the horse sports journalist Christel Behrmann in 2010. They divorced in 2012. In April 2013 he married the British-Canadian doctor of psychology, Lee Welton Croll. Their first child was born in 2016.

 Cecilia Gyllenhammar, his oldest daughter, who grew up as the "Princess of Göteborg", has written a novel about the childhood of an upper class girl, the daughter of a business man in Göteborg, marked by eating disorder and self-disgust. The novel is strongly critical towards Cecilia's upper-class background and, she admits, contains critic of both her parents but also purely fictional elements.  In the novel, the father is described as constantly unfaithful and the mother as failing to love her daughter. Cecilia refuses to give any detail of what is purely fiction in the novel, but claims both her parents have read it and supports her. Cecilia gave up a career as a journalist and has chosen not to make a career because of those of her parents.  
 Charlotte Gyllenhammar, a younger daughter, is a well-established artist with numerous exhibitions, public art commissions, and representation at various museums in Sweden.
 Sophie Gyllenhammar Mattson worked as a consultant before embarking a successful career as a designer of gold and jewels and has established her own brand "Sophie by Sophie".
 Oscar Gyllenhammar was working for Icon Medialab before starting his own IT company Compost in 2000 and has since made a failed attempt to start an internet portal (autoo.se) "together with some friends".

Awards and decorations

Swedish
   H. M. The King's Medal, 12th size gold (silver-gilt) medal worn around the neck on the Order of the Seraphim ribbon (1981)
   Commander 1st Class of the Order of Vasa (1973)
   Knight of the Order of Vasa (1965)

Foreign
   Commander 1st Class of the Order of the White Rose of Finland (1986; Commander 1977)
   Commander of the Order of St. Olav (1 July 1984)
   Commander of the Order of Leopold (1989)
   Commander of the Legion of Honour (1987)
   Commander of the National Order of Merit (1980)

Honorships
Member of the Royal Swedish Academy of Engineering Sciences (1974)
Honorary member of Gothenburg nation at Lund University (1975)
Honorary Doctor of Medicine of the University of Gothenburg (1981)
Honorary Doctor of Technology at Brunel University London, England (1987)
Honorary Doctor of Engineering at the Technical University of Nova Scotia, Canada (1988)
Honorary Doctor of Social Sciences at the University of Helsinki (1990)
Honorary Doctor of Law at the University of Vermont, USA (1993)
Honorary Doctor of Economics at the School of Business, Economics and Law, University of Gothenburg (2003)
Fellow of the Norwegian Academy of Technological Sciences
Honorary Master of the Bench of the Inner Temple in London (2001)

References

1935 births
Living people
Businesspeople from Gothenburg
Swedish nobility
Swedish people of Jewish descent
Swedish businesspeople
Swedish chief executives in the automobile industry
Liberals (Sweden) politicians
Volvo people
Members of the Royal Swedish Academy of Engineering Sciences
Members of the Norwegian Academy of Technological Sciences
Lund University alumni
Directors of Skandia
N M Rothschild & Sons people